The men's singles competition in luge at the 2022 Winter Olympics was held on 5 February (heats 1 and 2) and 6 February (heats 3 and 4), at the Xiaohaituo Bobsleigh and Luge Track in Yanqing District. Johannes Ludwig of Germany won the event. For him this was the first individual Olympic gold medal. Wolfgang Kindl of Austria won the silver, and Dominik Fischnaller of Italy bronze. For Kindl and Fischnaller, these were their first Olympic medals.

The defending champion was David Gleirscher, who was standing in the 10th position at the 2021–22 Luge World Cup before the Olympics and qualified for the competition. Chris Mazdzer, the 2018 silver medalist, qualified as well. Johannes Ludwig, the 2018 bronze medalist, was leading the 2021–22 Luge World Cup before the Olympics and considered the top favorite. Wolfgang Kindl was the second in the World Cup, and the 2010 and 2014 Olympic champion Felix Loch was the third.

Ludwig won three runs out of four, in two of them setting the track record. Kindl won the second run and was second in the other three. Fischnaller was third in three runs.

Qualification

The qualification is based on the cumulative points of the Olympic Season from 1 July 2021 to January 10, 2022. A total of 35 quota spots are available to athletes to compete at the games. Each NOC can enter a maximum of three athletes.

In the men's singles, all nations with an athlete in the top 50 qualified one slot. If there were remaining spots left, the second best athlete of each nation in the top 32 was awarded an additional quota, with the third best being awarded a quota if there were any remaining spots.

On December 17, 2021, the International Luge Federation announced that the qualification system was changed. The qualification system was changed due to training runs being cancelled at the first World Cup, and equipment not being delivered to the following World Cups. The new system will see athletes qualify based on their top four results during the World Cup season, (as opposed to the previous all seven results counting).

On January 19, 2022 the International Luge Federation announced the list of qualified athletes.

Summary

Results

References

Luge at the 2022 Winter Olympics
Men's events at the 2022 Winter Olympics